Heinz Barth (15 October 1920 – 6 August 2007) was a mid-ranking member in the Waffen-SS of Nazi Germany during World War II. He was a convicted war criminal who was responsible for the Oradour-sur-Glane massacre of 1944. 

Barth was the only SS officer involved in the Oradour massacre to have been judged. He was found guilty by an East German court in 1983. Awarded a "war victim" pension in 1991 (which later became a wide-ranging controversy and led to changes in German law regarding war or disability pensions for World War II war criminals) by the reunified German government, he was released in 1997 and died in 2007.

Military and SS career
In 1938, he joined the National Socialist Motor Corps, taking motorised para-military training. He joined the NSDAP on 9 November 1939, on the anniversary of the Beer Hall Putsch with Party #7,844,901.

Barth enlisted in the military police, where he was made an officer. The 1983 East German court found that Barth participated, as a member of security police battalion, in execution of 92 Czech civilians during martial law in summer of 1942 in Klatovy and Pardubice. He was also one of those who, in June 1942, shot 32 citizens of Ležáky according to the historian Eduard Stehlík from the Military History Institute in Prague.

Barth joined the SS on 10 February 1943 (n°458037) with the rank of Untersturmführer(Second Lieutenant) and was assigned to the SS-Kraft Pioneers detachment. On 15 January 1943, he was moved to the 10th SS Panzer Division Frundsberg, later to the 3rd SS Division Totenkopf, and then, in October 1943, to the Eastern Front in the 2nd SS Division Das Reich He led a section in the 3rd company, 1st battalion of the 4th Panzergrenadier regiment Der Führer of the division.

In 1944, he became part of Adolf Diekmann's brigade, being under the direct command of Otto Erich Kahn. He then took part in the June 1944 Oradour-sur-Glane massacre by leading the group which led the men of the village into a barn and commanding the fire. During his 1983 trial, he testified to having personally shot roughly twelve to fifteen times into the crowd. He also confirmed that the massacre of 642 civilians (the whole village, including more than 200 children) had no military objective.

Trial and conviction
After the end of the war, Barth returned to his hometown in Brandenburg in the then German Democratic Republic. According to the AFP, he returned under a false name. He was tried in France in absentia on 12 February 1953, and sentenced to death for war crimes.

Identified and arrested on 14 June 1981 in Gransee, following an extensive investigation by the Stasi, Barth was tried in 1983 in East Germany and sentenced to life imprisonment for war crimes. The prosecutor, Horst Busse, said he did not seek a death sentence since Barth had cooperated throughout the investigation. Busse instead requested a life sentence, calling Barth "a relentless officer and a cold-blooded, merciless executor of Fascist violence."

Barth was the only officer to have been judged for the massacre. He claimed he was only following orders, and said he would've been court-martialed had he not obeyed. The defense was rejected by Busse. While on the witness stand, Barth started sobbing and said "I am ashamed that I took part in these operations and actions in occupied countries as a young man." However, several survivors of the massacre, who had testified during Barth's trial, said he did not have genuine guilt.

Other Nazi officers involved had taken refuge in West Germany (such as General Lammerding, commander of the Das Reich division) and had not been judged. Lammerding took up residence in Bad Tölz.

Barth was released in 1997 reportedly in consideration of his age and health and for having "expressed remorse". At the time of his release, Barth said he felt guilty, but that he had "paid long enough."

Controversy
Controversy arose because of the 800 mark pension Barth had been receiving as a wounded veteran for his lost leg since 1991, following German reunification. In 2000, a tribunal in Potsdam canceled the pension with the argument that a war criminal should not be granted a pension. In 2001, the Bundestag enacted a law stripping war criminals from obtaining disability compensation.

Barth's death was announced on 14 August 2007 by a priest in Gransee. However, the priest would only say that he died within the last few days of cancer, and did not disclose the place or exact date of his death.

Nazi hunter Serge Klarsfeld commented that "the man responsible of this horrible crime [in Oradour-sur-Glane], the one who had authorised its execution, General Heinz Lammerding, who lived in the Federal Republic of Germany, died unpunished.

References

External links 
Nazi war criminal dies in Germany, BBC obituary, 14 August 2007 
  Kriegsverbrecher Barth gestorben, Der Tagesspiegel
 Ex-SS Officer Confesses To Massacre in France, The New York Times
  "Ich habe befohlen: 'Feuern!'"

1920 births
2007 deaths
German mass murderers
People from Gransee
German prisoners sentenced to life imprisonment
German people convicted of crimes against humanity
Military history of France during World War II
Oradour-sur-Glane massacre
People from the Province of Brandenburg
Prisoners sentenced to life imprisonment by East Germany
Nazis convicted of war crimes
SS-Obersturmführer
Deaths from cancer in Germany
Waffen-SS personnel
National Socialist Motor Corps members
Nazis sentenced to death in absentia